This is a list of the official match balls for the FIFA World Cup finals tournaments.

From the 1970 FIFA World Cup, different official match balls have been used by FIFA.

See also 
 List of UEFA European Championship official match balls
 List of Copa América official match balls
 List of Africa Cup of Nations official match balls
 List of AFC Asian Cup official match balls
 List of Olympic Football official match balls

References

External links 
The First World Cup Ball
The History of the Official World Cup Match Balls at soccerball.com